George Bradley was a New Zealand rugby league footballer who played in the 1910s.

Playing career
Bradley played  in Wellington's 33-18 victory over Auckland during the 1913 New Zealand rugby league season Inter-district competition on Saturday 27 September 1913, this would be Wellington's last victory against Auckland until 1988.

International honours
Bradley represented New Zealand on the 1912 tour of Australia and on the 1913 tour of Australia, during the 1914 Great Britain Lions tour of Australia and New Zealand during the 1914 New Zealand rugby league season played left-, i.e. number 4, and was captain against Great Britain, and during the 1919 Australia rugby league tour of New Zealand during the 1919 New Zealand rugby league season against Australia (4-matches).

References

New Zealand national rugby league team players
New Zealand rugby league players
Place of birth missing
Place of death missing
Rugby league centres
Rugby league five-eighths
Rugby league wingers
Wellington rugby league team players
Year of death missing
New Zealand national rugby league team captains
1889 births